Ramziya Abbas al-Iryani or al-Eryani (1954 – November 14, 2013) was a pioneering Yemeni novelist, writer, diplomat and feminist. She was also the niece of the former president Abdul Rahman al-Iryani.

Biography 
She was born in the village of Iryan in the Ibb Governorate, went to secondary school in Taiz and then studied philosophy at Cairo University earning a bachelor's degree in 1977. She also had a master's degree in Arabic literature. In 1980 she became the first female diplomat to join the Yemeni diplomatic corps.  She was head of the Yemeni Women's Union (YWU) and was a board member of the Arab Family Organization. In her political work, she was a tireless supporter of feminism in Yemen and encouraged women to run for political office. In 2012, at the International Women's Day celebration, she gave a keynote speech as the director of YWU. Al-Eryani died in 2013 in Berlin during surgery; her body was returned to Sana'a and interred in al-Rahma cemetery.

Writing 
Al-Iryani started publishing when still in her teens. Her novel Ḍaḥīyat al-Jashaʿ (The Victim of Greed), published in 1970, is considered to be the first novel by a Yemeni woman. Her first book of short stories La'allahu ya'ud (Maybe He'll Return) was published from Damascus in 1981. Since then, she wrote  several more volumes of fiction as well as several children's books. She had also written a book on Yemeni women pioneers called Raidat Yemeniyat (1990). Al-Iryani's short stories have appeared in English translation in an anthology of Arab women writers.

Al-Iryani's writing addresses gender issues in a predominantly patriarchal, Islamic society. She also writes about the importance of education for women in an Arab society. Other themes in her work include Yemeni political struggles of the day.

References

External links
"SABANET" interviews Ramziya al-Iryani

1954 births
2013 deaths
Yemeni feminists
Yemeni women writers
People from Ibb Governorate
Yemeni women novelists
Cairo University alumni
20th-century novelists
20th-century Yemeni writers
20th-century Yemeni women writers
21st-century Yemeni writers
21st-century Yemeni women writers